State Road 537 (NM 537) is a  state highway in the US state of New Mexico. NM 537's southern terminus is at U.S. Route 550 (US 550) northwest of Cuba, and the northern terminus is at US 64 south-southwest of Dulce.

Major intersections

See also

References

537
Transportation in Sandoval County, New Mexico
Transportation in Rio Arriba County, New Mexico